Qanat-e Barz (also Romanized as Qanāt-e Barz) is a village in Chahar Gonbad Rural District, in the Central District of Sirjan County, Kerman Province, Iran. At the 2006 census, its population was 29, in 8 families.

References 

Populated places in Sirjan County